Rocco Basile is an American business executive and philanthropist. He is the founder of Avo Construction, a construction firm.

Career 
Rocco founded Avo Construction in 2011, a successor of Basile Builders Group. Basile Builders Group was based in Tribeca.

As a philanthropist, Rocco has helped establish an after-school program and is the recipient of the Children's Champion Award from the Children of the City program. He is a member of the board of directors of the Children of the city and has supported ComAlert and Safe Horizon.

References 

American philanthropists
Year of birth missing (living people)
Living people